Pearls II is an album by English singer Elkie Brooks, released in 1982.

Background 
The sequel to Brooks' popular Pearls album, A&M decided to play it safe by keeping Gus Dudgeon as producer. Another set of songs, old and new, helped to maintain Brooks' popularity. The album reached number five in the UK Albums Chart and remained on the chart for 25 weeks, where it joined its predecessor which was still riding high. Pearls II was later released on CD in 1993.

Originally, the album had a more rock-orientated feel and included a version of Free's "Be My Friend". However, the label was concerned that this harder direction would alienate Brooks' fans and hurriedly recorded "Loving Arms" as a replacement.

Track listing 
 "Goin' Back" (Gerry Goffin, Carole King) – 4:26
 "Our Love" (Graham Lyle, Billy Livsey) – 3:49
 "Gasoline Alley" (Ron Wood, Rod Stewart) – 3:36
 "I Just Can't Go On" (Lee Kosmin) – 4:07
 "Too Much Between Us" (Paul Millns) – 3:11
 "Don't Stop" (Christine McVie) – 3:13
 "Giving You Hope" (Elkie Brooks, Duncan MacKay) – 3:02
 "Money" (Roger Waters) – 4:43
 "Nights in White Satin" (Justin Hayward) – 4:37
 "Loving Arms" (Tom Jans) – 2:56
 "Will You Write Me a Song" (Nicholas Portlock, Robert Butterworth, Elkie Brooks) – 4:47

Charts

Single releases 
 "Our Love" (UK #43, 1982)
 "Nights in White Satin" (UK #33, 1982)
 "Will You Write Me a Song" (1982)
 "Gasoline Alley" (UK# 52, 1983)

Personnel 
Elkie Brooks – vocals
Pete Wingfield, Duncan MacKay – piano/keyboards
Tim Renwick, Geoff Whitehorn, Martin Jenner – guitars
John Giblin – bass guitar
Graham Jarvis, Dave Mattacks, John Lingwood – drums
Duncan Kinnell, Gus Dudgeon, Graham Jarvis, Frank Ricotti – percussion
Pete Wingfield, Jimmy Chambers, Katie Kissoon – backing vocals
Graham Dickson, Philip Barrett, Dave Bascombe, Leigh Mantle – engineers

References

Elkie Brooks albums
1982 albums
Albums produced by Gus Dudgeon
A&M Records albums